is a Japanese manga artist. She debuted in 1989 at the age of 18 with the short story "Pajama de Ojama" ("An Intrusion in Pajamas") and has since published more than 50 volumes of one-shots and long-running manga series. One of her most popular titles is Fushigi Yûgi. In 2008, she began her first  (boys') serialization, Arata: The Legend.

In 2019, Watase came out as X-gender, a Japanese non-binary gender identity. Following the announcement, an editor for Viz Media's Shojo Beat imprint clarified that Watase's pronouns in English are "she" and "her".

Early career and methods

Watase developed an interest in drawing manga at a young age. However, Watase did not receive any formal training until after high school when she went to a private art school. There she was taught how to draw manga, but because her first short story, "Pajama de Ojama", had already debuted, Watase quit in the middle of it.

Watase prefers to work with more traditional methods, because she believes the traditional methods have more feelings. Despite finding new media jarring, Watase has expressed a desire to work with new media as well. While Watase mostly works with colored inks and markers, she has used digital programs such as Photoshop to enhance traditional work.

Issues in career
In a 2014 blog post, Watase detailed some of the issues that she faced as a manga artist. A former editor for Arata: The Legend continuously asked Watase to redraw scenes that he did not like or understand. Watase was doing redraws all day and pulling late nights just to meet the next morning's deadlines. Because of the constant cycle, Watase began to lose interest in working on the manga for the fans or even the story. She was simply working to try and get it approved for the weekly publication.

Works

Watase Yuu Flower Comics
 Fushigi Yûgi – 18 vols.
 Fushigi Yûgi: Genbu Kaiden – 12 vols. 
 Fushigi Yûgi: Byakko Ibun – (oneshot)
 Fushigi Yûgi: Byakko Senki – ongoing, first vol. released in April 2018
 Shishunki Miman Okotowari – 3 vols.
 Zoku Shishunki Miman Okotowari – 3 vols.
 Shishunki Miman Okotowari Kanketsu Hen – 1 vol.
 Epotoransu! Mai – 2 vols.
 Ceres, Celestial Legend (Ayashi no Ceres) – 14 vols.
 Appare Jipangu! – 3 vols.
 Imadoki! – 5 vols.
 Alice 19th – 7 vols.
 Absolute Boyfriend (Zettai Kareshi) – 6 vols.
 Sakura-Gari – 3 vols.

Shōnen Sunday Comics
 Arata: The Legend (Arata Kangatari) – 24 vols.

Watase Yuu Masterpiece Collection
 Gomen Asobase!
 Magical
 Otenami Haiken!
 Suna no Tiara
 Mint de Kiss Me

YuuTopia Collection
 Oishii Study
 Musubiya Nanako

Yuu Watase Best Selection
 Sunde ni Touch
 Perfect Lovers

Watase Yuu Flower Comics Deluxe, Kanzenban, Shogakukan Bunko

Bunkoban
 Fushigi Yūgi Bunko – 10 vols.
 Ayashi no Ceres (Ceres, Celestial Legend) Bunko – 7 vols.
 Alice 19th Bunko – 4 vols.
 Zettai Kareshi Bunko – 3 vols.
 Imadoki! Bunko – 3 vols.
 Shishunki Miman Okotowari Bunko – 3 vols.

Kanzenban
 Fushigi Yūgi Kanzenban – 9 vols.

Flower Comics Deluxe
 Shishunki Miman Okotowari
 Shishunki Miman Okotowari/Zoku Shishunki Miman Okotowari
 Zoku Shishunki Miman Okotowari
 Pajama de Ojama
 Mint de Kiss Me
 Epotoransu! Mai

Artbooks
 Watase Yuu Illustration Collection Fushigi Yūgi
 Watase Yuu Illustration Collection – Part 2 Fushigi Yūgi Animation World
 "Ayashi no Ceres" Illustration Collection Tsumugi Uta ~Amatsu Sora Naru Hito o Kofutote~
 Yuu Watase Post Card Book I
 Yuu Watase Post Card Book II

Novels
 Shishunki Miman Okotowari – 4 vols.
 Fushigi Yūgi – 18 vols.
 Ayashi no Ceres – 6 vols.
 Fushigi Yūgi: Genbu Kaiden – 1 vol.
 Absolute Boyfriend – 6 vols.
 Masei Kishin Den (Illustration)
 Yada ze! (Illustration)
 Piratica (Illustration)

Notes

References

External links

  
  
 
 Q&A at Anime Expo 2000 (defunct; link via the Wayback Machine)
 Interview with Shonen Sunday (defunct; link via the Wayback Machine)

 
1970 births
Living people
Manga artists from Osaka Prefecture
People from Kishiwada, Osaka
Non-binary artists
Non-binary writers